The Menabrea III government of Italy held office from 13 May 1869 until 14 December 1869, a total of 215 days, or 7 months and 1 days.

Government parties
The government was composed by the following parties:

Composition

References

Italian governments
1869 establishments in Italy